= South Manchester Gazette =

The South Manchester Gazette was an English newspaper published in Manchester. The first issue appeared in May 1885, and proved to be so popular that it had sold out by 9:00 am. The Gazette went on sale every Saturday morning, priced at one penny.

The newspaper continued to be published until at least 1888.
